The 1995 European Baseball Championship was won by the Netherlands. It was held in the Netherlands.

Standings

References
(NL) European Championship Archive at honkbalsite

European Baseball Championship
European Baseball Championship
1995
1995 in Dutch sport